This is a list of earthquakes in 1972. Only magnitude 6.0 or greater earthquakes appear on the list. Lower magnitude events are included if they have caused death, injury or damage. Events which occurred in remote areas will be excluded from the list as they wouldn't have generated significant media interest. All dates are listed according to UTC time. Maximum intensities are indicated on the Mercalli intensity scale and are sourced from United States Geological Survey (USGS) ShakeMap data. The death toll of just over 40,000 was dominated by 2 events. In April, an earthquake struck Iran resulting in 30,000 of the deaths. This was one of the worst disasters in Iranian history. Late in December, Managua, Nicaragua was severely affected by a fairly modest magnitude 6.3 event. The location however contributed to 10,000 deaths and major destruction to the city. Activity was around normal for the year with 16 events exceeding magnitude 7.0. The largest struck the Philippines in December and measured 8.0. Taiwan, the Philippines and the southwest Pacific Islands had heightened seismic activity.

Overall

By death toll 

 Note: At least 10 casualties

By magnitude 

 Note: At least 7.0 magnitude

Notable events

January

February

March

April

May

June

July

August

September

October

November

December

References

1972
 
1972